The 1978–79 Tercera División season is the 2nd season of Tercera División since establishment as tier four.

Group 1

Group 2

Group 3

Group 4

Group 5

Group 6

References

External links
www.rsssf.com

Tercera División seasons
4
Spain